Brian Teacher defeated Kim Warwick in the final, 7–5, 7–6(7–4), 6–3 to win the men's singles tennis title at the 1980 Australian Open. The men's tournament was held from late December to early January 1981 – separately from the women's event, which was already held during late November.

Guillermo Vilas was the two-time defending champion, but lost in the semifinals to Warwick.

Seeds
The seeded players are listed below. Brian Teacher is the champion; others show the round in which they were eliminated.

  Guillermo Vilas (semifinals)
  Ivan Lendl (second round)
  José Luis Clerc (second round)
  Vitas Gerulaitis (first round)
  Brian Gottfried (third round)
  John Sadri (quarterfinals)
  Victor Amaya (third round)
  Brian Teacher (champion)
  Yannick Noah (first round)
  Bill Scanlon (quarterfinals)
  Víctor Pecci Sr. (second round)
  Paul McNamee (quarterfinals)
  Peter Fleming (first round)
  Kim Warwick (final)
  Peter McNamara (semifinals)
  Phil Dent (third round)

Qualifying

Draw

Key
 Q = Qualifier
 WC = Wild card
 LL = Lucky loser
 r = Retired

Final eight

Section 1

Section 2

Section 3

Section 4

External links
 Association of Tennis Professionals (ATP) – 1980 Australian Open Men's Singles draw
 1980 Australian Open – Men's draws and results at the International Tennis Federation

Mens singles
Australian Open (tennis) by year – Men's singles